"Give Me a Minute" is a song by Dublin rock band 21 Demands that was released in March 2007 reaching the Irish Singles Chart for the chart dated 22 March 2007.

This is the only charting hit as 21 Demands, before the band was renamed Kodaline.

Charts

Release history

See also
List of number-one singles of 2007 (Ireland)

References

2007 debut singles
Irish Singles Chart number-one singles
Kodaline songs
2007 songs
Song articles with missing songwriters